Sambhrama  is a 1999 Kannada-language romance film directed by Mahesh Sukhadare and produced by Srinivasa Combines banner. The story is a remake of the Malayalam film Ee Puzhayum Kadannu (1996).

The film stars Ramesh Aravind and Kaveri in leading roles, with Kalyan Kumar, Srinivasa Murthy and Hema Panchamukhi, among others, playing supporting roles.

Cast 
 Kalyan Kumar
 Ramesh Aravind 
 Kaveri 
 Hema Panchamukhi
 Vanishree
 B. V. Radha
 H. G. Dattatreya
 Karibasavaiah
 Srinivasa Murthy
 M. N. Lakshmi Devi
 Surekha
 Nagesh Yadav
 Poorvi Kulkarni

Soundtrack 
The music was composed by Hamsalekha for Jhankar music company. All the songs had lyrics written by him.

Reception
The Indian Express wrote "THOUGH it is a re-make of the Telugu movie Pellipeetalu, Sambhrama is like a cool shower on a hot summer day. Director Mahesh Sukhadhare, who is making his debut with this film, has succeeded in making a film that is good, clean fun."

See also
 Ee Puzhayum Kadannu
 Pelli Peetalu

References 

1999 films
1990s Kannada-language films
Films scored by Hamsalekha
Kannada remakes of Malayalam films